Pliny is an unincorporated community in Putnam County, West Virginia, United States.  It was named for M. Pliny Brown, an early settler. The ZIP code is 25158.

Located near Pliny is Maplewood, listed on the National Register of Historic Places in 2000.

Notable person 
 Virginia Mae Brown, set many "first woman" records

References

Unincorporated communities in Putnam County, West Virginia
Unincorporated communities in West Virginia
Charleston, West Virginia metropolitan area
Populated places on the Kanawha River